John James Dwyer, VC (9 March 1890 – 17 January 1962) Commonly known as Jack or JJ, he was a politician and an Australian recipient of the Victoria Cross, the highest award for gallantry in the face of the enemy that can be awarded to British and Commonwealth forces. Elected to the Tasmanian House of Assembly in 1931 representing the Labor Party, Dwyer served as Deputy Premier of Tasmania from August 1958 to May 1959 and remained in office until his death.

When Dwyer was 27 years old he was a sergeant in the 4th Company, Australian Machine Gun Corps, Australian Imperial Force during the First World War.  At that time, the following deed took place for which he was later awarded the VC.

On 26 September 1917 at Zonnebeke, Belgium, during the Battle of Polygon Wood, Sergeant Dwyer, in charge of a Vickers machine-gun during an advance, rushed his gun forward to within 30 yards of an enemy machine-gun, fired point blank at it and killed the crew. He then seized the gun and carried it back across shell-swept ground to the Australian front line. On the following day, when the position was being heavily shelled, and his Vickers gun was blown up, he took his team through the enemy barrage and fetched a reserve gun which he put into use in the shortest possible time.

Dwyer later achieved the rank of lieutenant. His Victoria Cross is displayed at the Australian War Memorial.

References

External links
 
 
 

|-

1890 births
1962 deaths
Military personnel from Tasmania
Australian Army officers
Australian Labor Party members of the Parliament of Tasmania
Australian World War I recipients of the Victoria Cross
Deputy Premiers of Tasmania
Members of the Tasmanian House of Assembly
Speakers of the Tasmanian House of Assembly